The Canadian Journal of Infectious Diseases and Medical Microbiology is a quarterly peer-reviewed medical journal. It is the official journal of the Canadian Association for HIV Research, for which it serves as the primary source of society guidelines. It is published by Hindawi Publishing Corporation and covers all aspects of infectious diseases and medical microbiology.

In 2012, the journal moved to open access.

Abstracting and indexing
The journal is abstracted and indexed in CAB Abstracts, Embase, Global Health, Science Citation Index Expanded, and Scopus. According to the Journal Citation Reports, the journal has a 2015 impact factor of 0.991.

References

External links 
 

Microbiology journals
Multilingual journals
Quarterly journals
Publications established in 1990
Hindawi Publishing Corporation academic journals
Academic journals associated with learned and professional societies of Canada